Utrikespolitiska institutet is the Swedish name for two organizations:

 Swedish Institute of International Affairs
 Finnish Institute of International Affairs